The Crown Buildings, which are also known as the Cathays Park Buildings, are the Welsh Government's main offices in Cardiff, Wales. The buildings were formerly used by the Welsh Office and are situated in Cathays Park. The complex consists of two buildings, Cathays Park 1 (a Grade II-listed building) and Cathays Park 2, joined by two skybridges.

In 1914 foundations were laid for an imposing neoclassical building on this site housing Welsh Government Offices, to a design by R. J. Allison, architect to the Office of Works. Work soon stopped and did not resume for twenty years. In 1934–8, the block now known as Cathays Park 1 (a.k.a. CP1 or old Crown Building) was built by P. E. Hanton, as offices for the Welsh Board of Health. It also has an attic and a basement.

Cathays Park 2 (a.k.a. The Encyclopaedia of Wales describes CP2, completed in 1979, as conveying an impression of "bureaucracy under siege". The historian John Davies, however, regarded the complex as being "splendid".

The sky bridge between Cathays Park 1 and 2 'the link' has been the subject of some discussion amongst staff based in the building. People have reported an eerie feeling, a general sense of something "unworldly" with people catching fleeting glimpses out of the corner of their eye which had led to rumours of the area being haunted.

In 1968, Cathays Park 1 was damaged by a bomb explosion, the second in the area in under 12 months following a previous attack on the nearby Temple of Peace.

Notes

External links 
 Aerial photograph of Cathays Park (the Crown Buildings are in the middle foreground)
 The National Assembly for Wales – A Home For the Assembly

Government buildings in Wales
Grade II listed buildings in Cardiff
Politics of Cardiff
Neoclassical architecture in Wales
Cathays Park
Terrorist incidents in Cardiff
Stripped Classical architecture